Ijebu East is a Local Government Area in Ogun State, Nigeria bordering Lagos State and Lagos Lagoon in the south. Its headquarters are in the town of Ogbere on the A121 highwayat.

Ijebu East is the largest LGA by area in Ogun State, with an area of 2,234 km and a population of 110,196 at the 2006 census. Some of the major towns in the LGA include Itele Ijebu, Ijebu Ife, Imobi, Ijebu Imushin and Ogbere where the LGA's secretariat is located.
 
The postal code of the area is 120.

References

Local Government Areas in Ogun State